Citrus Center is an unincorporated community in Glades County, Florida, United States, located on State Road 78 approximately  west of the junction of SR 78 and U.S. Route 27, west of Moore Haven.

References

Unincorporated communities in Glades County, Florida
Unincorporated communities in Florida